The 2002 Singha Thailand Masters was a professional ranking snooker tournament that took place between 4–10 March 2002 at the Merchant Court Hotel in Bangkok, Thailand. This was the last edition of the tournament as a ranking event.

Mark Williams won in the final 9–4 against Stephen Lee. The defending champion, Ken Doherty, was defeated by Lee in the quarter-finals.


Main draw

Final

References

2002 in snooker